Ryan Jaso is an American music executive and artist manager in the electronic dance music scene and the broader music industry.  Jaso also co-hosts a podcast called Neon Black with radio personality Michael Catherwood and Seb Webber.  Jaso is notable for launching CONTROL and today he is the chief executive officer of Super Evil Genius Corp., a 360-degree creative agency, that has worked with artists such as Chris Lake, Fisher, Tommy Trash, and others.

Early life and education 
Ryan Jaso was born to Jerry and M'Liss Jaso on May 16, 1983. His father was a high school football coach for 38 years. Jaso graduated from Huntington Beach High School before going to Orange Coast College and Golden West College, embarking on his ambitions in music soon thereafter.

Early career 
After moving to Los Angeles at age 21, Jaso formed Whitelite Productions with his partner Chris Alba in 2006.  Through Whitelite, Jaso and his partner booked Steve Aoki, Afrika Bambaataa, Datarock, DJ Klever, and DJ Falcon for their first monthly series of events called "Made You Look" in Costa Mesa. Concurrently, Jaso and his partner launched a Sunday party in Los Angeles where they brought acts like Miami Horror, Nosaj Thing, and Classixx.

As part of his expanding ambitions in the music industry, Jaso, by himself, launched Technique Management, an artist management company.  His first client was Mr. Whiite.  Jaso over time then built his roster of artist clients to include many headlining acts including MAKJ, Cold Blank, and Chris James, a singer-songwriter known for his work with deadmau5 on their song, "The Veldt". Jaso eventually moved his management venture over to ATC Management in 2015.

CONTROL  
With their continued success in managing artists and throwing parties, Jaso and Alba launched a new dance music brand called CONTROL.  After initially starting as a weekly party every Friday at Avalon Hollywood the CONTROL brand expanded with various partnerships including with, Gary Richards, the founder of Hard Events and companies like iHeartMedia, among others.  

CONTROL further grew its reach with new shows in San Francisco taking over Thursdays at Ruby Skye with the likes of Tommy Trash. Eventually, they moved the DNA Lounge before eventually closing the San Francisco party in late 2017. CONTROL reached a six-year milestone in 2015 and was recognized across the music industry for its role in supporting and breaking major talents. CONTROL to date has thrown over 500+ shows in eleven years across California with showcases and headlining tour spots for major artists such as Skrillex, Major Lazer, and DJ Snake.   Felix Cartal was the first booked guest for CONTROL Fridays at Avalon Hollywood.

In 2017, Jaso launched CONTROL Forever, a multimedia channel and podcast network.  Jaso was also the executive producer of the CONTROL Forever podcast High and Dry with hosts Jason Ellis, Mike Catherwood and Kate Ellis. Past guests include Dr Drew, David Arquette, Rude Jude, Stephanie Beatriz and Tito Ortiz.  The podcast aired 47 episodes from March 2019– February 2020. 

In 2018, Jaso and his co-hosts, Seb Webber, Mike Catherwood and Cheyne Gilmore launched a podcast called Neon Black where they dissect pop culture and the inner workings of the music industry. As of 2020, Jaso continues to operate CONTROL Forever.  Jaso is also the CEO and founder of Super Evil Genius Corp, a 360-degree creative agency, who has worked with artists such as Chris Lake, Fisher, Tommy Trash, and others.

Other work 
From 2014 to 2016, Jaso was hand picked by Steve Angello to manage his label, Size Records and his underground label "X." Jaso oversaw and signed records for Don Diablo, Shaun Frank, and "Wasted Love", the lead single from Steve Angello's debut album Wild Youth.  While at SIZE, Jaso also worked with Ansel Elgort on his DJ project, Ansolo.

External links 
 Super Evil Genius Corp.
 CONTROL Forever
 IMdb
 Neon Black (Podcast)
 High And Dry Podcast

References 

1983 births
Living people
American business executives
People from Long Beach, California
People from Los Angeles County, California
Talent managers
American music industry executives